Gerard Brady (1 July 1936 – 16 May 2020) was an Irish Fianna Fáil politician who served as Minister for Education from October to December 1982.

Brady was born in Dublin in 1936. He was educated at St. Mary's College in Rathmines and later at the College of Science and Technology and the College of Pharmacy in the city. Following his graduation he worked as an ophthalmic optician. Brady's first entry into the political scene was at local level when he was elected to Dublin City Council in 1974. At the 1977 general election he was elected to Dáil Éireann at his first attempt, succeeding his father Philip Brady as Fianna Fáil Teachta Dála (TD) for the Dublin Rathmines West constituency. He represented Dublin South-East from 1981 onwards.

He was appointed Minister of State at the Department of the Environment by Charles Haughey in March 1982. Following the resignation of Martin O'Donoghue as Minister for Education on 6 October that year, Haughey chose to make himself acting Minister for three weeks before appointing Brady to the post on 27 October. Less than a month later Fianna Fáil lost the November 1982 general election, and Gemma Hussey became the new Minister for Education on 14 December. Brady's Cabinet tenure is one of the shortest in history. He was reappointed to the opposition frontbench but was not given a ministerial job when the party returned to power in 1987, nor in 1989. He lost his seat at the 1992 general election to party colleague Eoin Ryan, and subsequently retired from political life.

Brady died on 16 May 2020, in Donnybrook, Dublin, aged 82.

See also
Families in the Oireachtas

References

 

1936 births
2020 deaths
Fianna Fáil TDs
Members of the 21st Dáil
Members of the 22nd Dáil
Members of the 23rd Dáil
Members of the 24th Dáil
Members of the 25th Dáil
Members of the 26th Dáil
Local councillors in Dublin (city)
Ministers for Education (Ireland)
Ministers of State of the 23rd Dáil